The 1986 Western Australian state election was held on 8 February 1986.

Retiring Members

Labor
John Harman MLA (Maylands)
Colin Jamieson MLA (Welshpool)
Lyla Elliott MLC (North-East Metropolitan)

Liberal
Peter Coyne MLA (Murchison-Eyre)
Anthony Trethowan MLA (East Melville)
Graham MacKinnon MLC (South-West)
Ian Medcalf MLC (Metropolitan)

Independent
Tom Dadour MLA (Subiaco) – elected as Liberal

Legislative Assembly
Sitting members are shown in bold text. Successful candidates are highlighted in the relevant colour. Where there is possible confusion, an asterisk (*) is also used.

Legislative Council

Sitting members are shown in bold text. Successful candidates are highlighted in the relevant colour. Where there is possible confusion, an asterisk (*) is also used.

See also
 Members of the Western Australian Legislative Assembly, 1983–1986
 Members of the Western Australian Legislative Assembly, 1986–1989
 Members of the Western Australian Legislative Council, 1983–1986
 Members of the Western Australian Legislative Council, 1986–1989
 1986 Western Australian state election

References
 

Candidates for Western Australian state elections